James Shoal is an underwater shoal (bank) in the South China Sea, with a depth of  below the surface of the sea, located about  off the Borneo coast of Malaysia.  It is claimed by Malaysia, the People's Republic of China, and the Republic of China (Taiwan). The shoal and its surrounds are administered by Malaysia.

Name

James Shoal is also called Beting Serupai (Malaysia) and Zengmu Reef / Zengmu Shoal / Tseng-mu An-sha (China mainland and Taiwan).

History 
James Shoal, along with its two nearby features, Parsons’ Shoal (Betting Tugau, 八仙暗沙, 9.35 km due south) and Lydie Shoal (Betting Mukah, 立地暗沙, 27.94 km west-southwest), were recognised by British surveyors in the early 19th Century via many of its surveys. James Shoal first appeared on the British Admiralty Chart in the 1870s. In 1933 a government committee of the Republic of China gave Chinese names to many features in the South China Sea. These were mainly translations or transliterations of the names on the British charts. The name 'James' was transliterated as Zeng Mu (the letters 'J' and 'M'). 'Shoal' was translated as 'Tan' - meaning sandbank. It appears the Chinese committee wrongly thought that James Shoal was an island. In 1947 the RoC changed the name to 'Ansha' - meaning 'shoal' or 'reef'.

Location 

Geographically, it sits south of the Spratly Islands, but is sometimes grouped with them as part of international disputes over sovereignty in the South China Sea.

The shoal is embedded in the continental shelf of Malaysia and well within its 200 nautical mile EEZ.

Nearby shoals are Parsons' Shoal and Lydie Shoal, and the Luconia Shoals, the latter 97 to 223 km to the north.

Territorial dispute

Malaysia's claim 
Malaysia's claim on the shoal is based on the continental shelf principle, on the basis that Malaysia is the only country whose continental shelf covers James Shoal. International law defines continental shelf as a natural extension of a country's landmass to a distance of 200 nautical miles (maximum 350 nautical miles). Drawn from the mainland or any of its islands in the South China Sea, the continental shelf of China is well short of James Shoal. Similarly, James Shoal is also not part of the extended continental shelf of Vietnam, the Philippines or  Republic of China (Taiwan).

In May 2009, Vietnam and Malaysia put up a Joint submission on the Extended Continental Shelf to the UN Committee on the Limit of Continental Shelf (CLCS) whereby Vietnam acknowledged that James Shoal is not part of its extended continental shelf.

It is also outside Brunei's extended maritime zone which the 2009 Letter of Exchange that Brunei has with Malaysia attests to. In 1969, Malaysia and Indonesia signed a Treaty on the continental shelf, off Tanjung Datu, Sarawak, which has placed James Shoal on the Malaysian side.

Malaysian jurisdiction 
Malaysia has also effectively asserted its jurisdiction over its continental shelf including the areas in and around James Shoal, Parson's Shoal and the Lydie Shoal. The activities of the Malaysian authorities include the construction and maintenance of a light-buoy on nearby Parson's Shoal on a 24/7 basis, daily patrolling and policing of the area by the Royal Malaysian Navy and the Malaysian Maritime Enforcement Agency and undertaking economic activities like exploration for and production of hydrocarbon resources on a sustained basis.

Under international law, such display of peaceful and continuous activities over a long period is tantamount to establishing a titre de souverain (acts of the sovereign).

China's claim 

The shoal is claimed to be the southernmost territory of China by the People's Republic of China and  Republic of China (Taiwan). China transliterated the British name as Zeng Mu Tan in 1933, and renamed it Zeng Mu Ansha in 1947. The People's Liberation Army Navy visited the shoal in May 1981, again in 1994, and on 26March 2013. China Marine Surveillance ships visited the shoal and placed a sovereignty stele in the maritime area of the shoal to mark it as Chinese territory on 26 March 1990, again in January 1992, on 15 January 1995, on 20 April 2010 and in 2012.

On 29 January 2014, Chinese state news agency Xinhua reported that three Chinese warships (one amphibious landing craft and two destroyers) returned to James Shoal to conduct military drills and perform an oath swearing ceremony. The Royal Malaysian Navy chief Tan Sri Abdul Aziz Jaafar denied the report, saying that the Chinese exercise took place hundreds of miles to the north in international waters.

Chinese students are taught and tested in schools that James Shoal is the southernmost point of Chinese territory, and that territory within the nine-dash line has always belonged to China, without any reference to the disputes over the islands and surrounding waters by neighbouring countries.

In July 2020, U.S. Secretary of State Michael Pompeo wrote concerning the claim:

Oil and gas reserves 
Active exploration and development of oil and gas fields by Malaysia has been taking place around the James Shoal since 2014, with several production facilities erected in the surrounding area. Malaysia has also been undertaking exploration for and production of hydrocarbon resources on a sustained basis in the area, effectively asserting jurisdiction over the area.

See also 
 South China Sea
 Territorial disputes in the South China Sea

References

External links
TPC L-11D Indonesia (Map), U.S. Defense Mapping Agency Aerospace Center, compiled 1984

Reefs of the South China Sea
Shoals of the Spratly Islands